In the 2011–12 season, Partizan mt:s Belgrade competed in the Basketball League of Serbia, the Radivoj Korać Cup, the Adriatic League and the Euroleague.

Players

Roster

Depth chart

Roster changes
In
  Marko Čakarević (from Radnički Kragujevac)
  Danilo Anđušić (from KK Hemofarm)
  Acie Law (from  Golden State Warriors)
  Nikola Peković (from  Minnesota Timberwolves)
  Miroslav Raduljica (from  Anadolu Efes S.K.)
  Milan Mačvan (from  Maccabi Tel Aviv)
  Davis Bertans (from  Union Olimpija)
  Dominic James (from  Aris)

Out
  Nathan Jawai (to  UNICS Kazan)
  James Gist (to  Fenerbahçe Ülker)
  Curtis Jerrells (to  Fenerbahçe Ülker)
  Jan Veselý (to  Washington Wizards)
  Acie Law (to  Olympiakos)

Competitions

Basketball League of Serbia

Kup Radivoja Koraća

Quarterfinals

Semifinals

Final

Adriatic League

Regular season

Standings

Pld - Played; W - Won; L - Lost; PF - Points for; PA - Points against; Diff - Difference; Pts - Points.

Matches

Playoff

Euroleague

Regular season

Standings

Matches

Individual awards
Euroleague

Euroleague Weekly MVPs
 Milan Mačvan – Regular season, Week 7

Adriatic League

MVP of the Round
 Nikola Peković – Round 3
 Miroslav Raduljica – Round 15
 Milan Mačvan – Round 26

Radivoj Korać Cup

Finals MVP
 Danilo Anđušić

Basketball League of Serbia

MVP of the Round
 Miroslav Raduljica – Round 2
 Milan Mačvan – Round 10
 Miroslav Raduljica – Round 13
 Vladimir Lučić – Play off, Round 6
 Milan Mačvan – Play off, Round 7

References

External links
 Official website 

2011-12
2011–12 in Serbian basketball by club
2011–12 Euroleague by club